Chouteau was the name of a highly successful, ethnically French fur-trading family based in Saint Louis, Missouri, which they helped found. 
Their ancestors Chouteau and Laclède initially settled in New Orleans. They then moved-up the Mississippi river and established posts in the Midwest and Western United States, particularly along the Missouri River and in the Southwest.  Various locations were named after this family.

People
Marie-Therese Bourgeois Chouteau (1733-1814), matriarch of the family

children of Marie-Therèse Bourgeois Chouteau and René Augustin Chouteau, Sr.
René Auguste Chouteau (1750-1829), founder of St. Louis, Missouri

Auguste Aristide Chouteau (1792-1833), fur trader
Henri Chouteau I (1805-1855), railroad executive, killed in Gasconade Bridge train disaster
Henri Chouteau II (1830-1854), married Julia Deaver
Azby Auguste Chouteau Sr. (1853-?), lawyer and one of the founders of Minnesela, South Dakota, husband of Cora Baker (great-great-granddaughter of Isaac Shelby)
Azby Chouteau Jr. (1884-?)
Henri Arminstead Chouteau III (1889-1952), realtor
Edward Chouteau (1807-1846), trader
Gabriel Chouteau (1794-1887), served in War of 1812
Eulalie Chouteau (1799-1835), married René Paul (1783-1851), first surveyor of St. Louis
Gabriel René Paul (1813-1886), Union Army general in the American Civil War
Louise Chouteau, married Gabriel Paul, French chevalier
Emilie Chouteau, married Thomas Floyd, US officer in the Black Hawk War

Children of Marie-Therèse Bourgeois Chouteau and Pierre Laclède (also founder of St. Louis, Missouri):
Victoire Chouteau, (1760-1825), wife of Charles Gratiot, Sr., financier of the Illinois campaign during the American Revolutionary War
Charles Gratiot, (1786-1855), builder of Fort Meigs and Fort Monroe and participant in Battle of Mackinac Island
Henry Gratiot (1789-1856), soldier in the Black Hawk War
Adèle Gratiot (1826-1887), wife of Elihu B. Washburne (1816-1887), U.S. Secretary of State and U.S. Ambassador to France
Jean Pierre Chouteau (1758-1849)

Auguste Pierre Chouteau (1786-1838), founder of posts in Oklahoma and Chouteau, Oklahoma
Emilie Sophie Chouteau (1813-1874), wife of Nicolas DeMenil and owner of Chatillon-DeMenil House
Pierre Chouteau, Jr., nicknamed 'Cadet', (1789-1865), founder of posts on Upper Missouri River, including Fort Pierre and Chouteau County, Montana, and partner to Bernard A. Pratte in the Pratte & Chouteau Trading Company.
François Chouteau, first official European settler of Kansas City, Missouri

Yvonne Chouteau (1929-2016), 20th-century Shawnee classical ballerina, one of the "Five Moons" of Oklahoma; 5th-generation descendant of Jean Pierre Chouteau

Marie Pelagie Chouteau (1760-1812), grandmother of Emilie Pratt, wife of Ramsay Crooks (1780-1859), General Manager and President of the American Fur Company and business partner of Jean Pierre Chouteau

Places
Choteau, Montana
Chouteau County, Montana
Chouteau, Oklahoma
Chouteau Creek, Mayes County, Oklahoma
Pierre, South Dakota (named for Pierre Chouteau, Jr.)
Chouteau Bridge across the Missouri River in Kansas City
Chouteau's Landing in St. Louis
Chouteau Avenue in St. Louis

The family sold the Chouteau posts along the upper Missouri River in 1865 after the American Civil War to Americans James B. Hubbell, Alpheus F. Hawley, James A. Smith, C. Francis Bates. Hubbell, based in Minnesota, already had some licenses from the federal government to trade with Native Americans in the West. He and his colleague Hawley formed a partnership with these men to set up a business. They formed the Northwestern Fur Company and operated it through posts along the upper Missouri River until 1870. They closed the business due to losses of equipment and furs during the Sioux uprising and warfare during the 1860s, which resulted in a volatile environment that made it too difficult to operate.

References

External links
 "The Chouteau Family", Encyclopedia of Oklahoma History and Culture
 "Henri Arminstead Chouteau." Find a Grave. N.p., 29 Sept. 2007. Web. 

French families
Business families
American families of French ancestry